The Andover Inn is a historic inn located on the campus of Phillips Academy in Andover, Massachusetts. It was built upon the site of a stone building that had once been lived in by Harriet Beecher Stowe. It was first built in 1930 and was known as the Phillips Inn until 1940. It is located on Chapel Avenue next to the Addison Gallery of American Art. 

The building was designed by Sidney Wagner with Charles A. Platt as the supervising architect. It is a three story Georgian style building. The front of the building features a recessed porch with white columns that is flanked by two wings. The building also features multi-pane double hung windows and French doors. There is a slate gambrel roof. The back of the building now overlooks a pond, but it previously featured a view of a large perennial garden that was tended by original innkeeper's wife. 

Many of its visitors are relatives of current or prospective Andover students. It also receives visitors who are in the area for other reasons. The Inn has always been owned by the school but has always been independently managed. In 2008 Phillips Academy filed a lawsuit against the company that had managed the inn for three years. The suit claimed that the management company did not pay its rent. The hotel is now managed by Waterford Hotel Group.

In 2009 the Inn was shut down and remodeled for 15 months. It was the first major renovation since 1930. It now features a fine-dining restaurant known as Samuel’s. The hotel retained much of its original architecture, but it was expanded to thirty rooms and two private function spaces, each able to contain up to 50 people.

References

External links
Andover Inn website

Hotels in Massachusetts
Phillips Academy
Hotels established in 1930
Hotel buildings completed in 1930